Donald Cameron Carmichael (3 March 1937 – 8 October 2020) was an Australian rules footballer who played with Essendon in the Victorian Football League (VFL).

Carmichael won Essendon's reserves best and fairest in 1955 and he later played with St Kilda's reserves, Redan, Williamstown and Sale. Carmichael played 90 games for Williamstown from 1960-65, kicking 31 goals and played in the 1961 and 1964 VFA grand finals. He finished in third place in the Club's 1962 best and fairest award and was awarded the most serviceable player trophy in 1961. He went to Sale in 1966 and spent the remainder of his life there.

Notes

External links 
		

Essendon Football Club past player profile

1937 births
2020 deaths
Australian rules footballers from Victoria (Australia)
Essendon Football Club players
Redan Football Club players
Williamstown Football Club players
Sale Football Club players